William Ewart Gladstone (1809–1898) was a British Liberal and earlier conservative politician, and four-time prime minister.

Gladstone may also refer to:

People
 Gladstone (surname)
 Gladstone Small (born 1961), Warwickshire and England cricketer
 Gladstone (footballer), Brazilian footballer Gladstone Pereira della Valentina (born 1985)

Places

Australia
 Gladstone, New South Wales, in Raleigh County
 Gladstone, Queensland
 Gladstone Region, a Queensland Local Government Area
 City of Gladstone, a former Queensland Local Government Area
 Electoral district of Gladstone, a Queensland Legislative Assembly electoral district
 Gladstone Harbour, Queensland
 Gladstone, South Australia
 Gladstone, Tasmania, a small town in north-east Tasmania
 County of Gladstone (Northern Territory), a cadastral unit
 County of Gladstone, a cadastral unit in Victoria

Canada
 Gladstone, Manitoba
 Gladstone, Ontario, a community
 Gladstone Parish, New Brunswick

New Zealand
 Gladstone, Invercargill, a suburb of Invercargill and a former borough
 Gladstone, New Zealand, an area in the Carterton district in the North Island
 Gladstone (New Zealand electorate), an electorate in the Canterbury region

United Kingdom
 Gladstone Park, London, a large park in Brent, London

United States
 Gladstone, California, a town (1887–1905), now part of Azusa
 Gladstone, Illinois
 Gladstone, Michigan
 Gladstone, Missouri
 Gladstone, Nebraska
 Gladstone, New Jersey
 Gladstone, New Mexico
 Gladstone, North Dakota
 Gladstone, Ohio
 Gladstone, Oregon
 Gladstone, Virginia
 Gladstone Peak, Colorado

Fictional characters
 Gladstone Gander, a Disney character, cousin of Donald Duck
 Joey Gladstone, one of the main characters on TV series Full House
 Mr. Gladstone, a pseudonym taken by character Benjamin Braddock in the film The Graduate (1967)
 William Gladstone, a character in Jonathan Stroud's Bartimaeus series, loosely based on William Ewart Gladstone

Transportation 
 Gladstone railway line, a former railway line in South Australia
 Gladstone Branch, a New Jersey Transit commuter rail line
 Gladstone class or LB&SCR B1 class, a series of steam locomotives in the 1880s
 Gladstone station (disambiguation), stations of the name

Other uses
 Gladstone baronets, members of the extended family of William Ewart Gladstone
 Gladstone (cat), the resident Chief Mouser of HM Treasury
 Gladstone bag, a type of suitcase with flexible sides and a rigid frame
 HMAS Gladstone, two ships of the Australian navy
 Gladstone Power Station
 The Gladstone Arms, a public house in Southwark, England
 Gladstone Pottery Museum, a working pottery museum in Stoke-on-Trent, England
 Gladstone Secondary School, a public secondary school in Vancouver, British Columbia
 Gladstone, an ABC/Dunhill Records 1970s rock band from Tyler, Texas
 Gladstone Publishing, publisher of Disney Comics in the 1980s and 1990s

See also
 Gladstones (disambiguation)